Sir George Hayter (17 December 1792 – 18 January 1871) was an English painter, specialising in portraits and large works involving in some cases several hundred individual portraits. Queen Victoria appreciated his merits and appointed Hayter her Principal Painter in Ordinary and also awarded him a Knighthood 1841.

Early life 

Hayter was the son of Charles Hayter (1761–1835), a miniature painter and popular drawing-master and teacher of perspective who was appointed Professor of Perspective and Drawing to Princess Charlotte and published a well-known introduction to perspective and other works.

Initially tutored by his father, he went to the Royal Academy Schools early in 1808, but in the same year, after a disagreement about his art studies, ran away to sea as a Midshipman in the Royal Navy. His father secured his release, and they came to an agreement that Hayter should assist him while pursuing his own studies.

In 1809 he secretly married Sarah Milton, a lodger at his father's house (he was 15 or 16, she 28), the arrangement remaining secret until around 1811. Together they had three children Georgiana, Leopold and Henry.

At the Royal Academy Schools he studied under Fuseli, and in 1815 was appointed Painter of Miniatures and Portraits by Princess Charlotte. Hayter was awarded the British Institution’s premium for history painting for the Prophet Ezra (1815; Downton Castle), purchased by Richard Payne Knight.

Around 1816 his wife left him, for reasons which are not apparent. He subsequently began a relationship with Louisa Cauty, daughter of Sir William Cauty, with whom he lived openly for the next decade and who bore him two children, Angelo and Louisa (despite not having sought a divorce from his first wife).

Travel to Italy 
Encouraged by his patron, John Russell, 6th Duke of Bedford, he travelled to Italy to study in 1816. There he met Canova, whose studio he attended while painting his portrait, where he absorbed Canova's classical style. He is also believed to have learned sculpture from Canova at this time. Canova was Perpetual Principal of the Accademia di San Luca (Rome's premier artistic institution) and doubtless put Hayter forward for honorary membership on the strength of his painting ‘The Tribute Money’ which was very favourably received in Rome. Hayter thereby became the Academy's youngest ever member.

Historical portraiture 
 Returning to London in 1818, Hayter practised as a portrait painter in oils and history painter. Dubbed ‘The Phoenix’ by William Beckford, Hayter showed a pomposity that irritated his fellow artists, but he mixed freely with many aristocratic families. His unconventional domestic life (separated from his wife, yet living with his mistress) set him apart from official Academy circles: he was never elected to the Royal Academy.

Hayter was most productive and innovative during the 1820s. George Agar-Ellis (later Lord Dover) commissioned the Trial of Queen Caroline in the House of Lords in 1820 (exh. Cauty's Great Rooms, 80-82 Pall Mall, 1823; London, National Portrait Gallery); painted on a large scale (2.33×2.66 m), Hayter's first (and most successful) contemporary history painting revealed a taste for high drama effectively realised. In the Trial of William, Lord Russell, in the Old Bailey in 1683 (1825; Woburn Abbey) Hayter celebrated John Russell's ancestry, in a work reminiscent of fashionable tableaux vivants of the country-house set.

Return to the Continent 
In 1826 Hayter settled in Italy. The Banditti of Kurdistan Assisting Georgians in Carrying off Circassian Women (untraced), completed in Florence for John Proby, 1st Earl of Carysfort (exhibited British Institution 1829), demonstrated Hayter's assimilation of the style and exotic subject-matter of contemporary French Romantic art.

In 1827 his mistress, Louisa Cauty, died after poisoning herself with arsenic. Although it was apparently an accident, in a bid for attention, it was widely assumed that he had driven her to suicide, and he was forced by the scandal to move from Florence to Rome.

By late 1828 he was in Paris, where his portraits of English society members (some exhibited at the Salon in 1831) were stylistically akin to the work of recent French portrait painters such as François Gérard.

Royal patronage 
In 1831 Hayter returned to England. His grandiose plan to paint the first sitting after the passage of the Reform Bill resulted in his painting Moving the Address to the Crown on the Opening of the First Reformed Parliament in the Old House of Commons, 5 February 1833 (1833–1843; London, N.P.G.), for which he executed nearly 400 portrait studies in oil. Hayter was an ardent supporter of the reform movement and this painting was not commissioned but to all intents and purposes a labour of love. It occupied him for ten years with no guarantee of financial reward. This is one of the last images executed of the interior of the old House of Commons before its destruction in the fire of 1834. The painting was finally purchased by the government for the nation in 1854, 20 years after it was started.
Having painted the young Princess Victoria (1832–3; destr.; oil sketch, Brit. Royal Col.), Hayter was not a surprising choice as the new Queen's 'Portrait and Historical Painter'. But on the death of Sir David Wilkie in 1841 Hayter's appointment as Principal Painter in Ordinary to the Queen caused some annoyance at the Royal Academy as this appointment had historically been the preserve of the President, then Sir Martin Archer Shee. In 1842 Hayter was knighted. He painted several royal ceremonies including Queen Victoria's coronation of 1838 and marriage of 1840 and also the Christening of the Prince of Wales of 1843 (all Brit. Royal Col.). He also painted several royal portraits including his most well-known work the State Portrait of the new Queen Victoria. Several versions of this portrait were done, with the assistance of the artist's son Angelo, to be sent as diplomatic gifts. Hayter's active period at court was short-lived, however, because Albert preferred German painters such as F. X. Winterhalter.

Several significant examples of Hayter's works from this period remain a part of the Royal Collection, and both the State Portrait and Wedding painting are among those displayed to the public at Buckingham Palace. There is also a full-scale version of the State Portrait in the National Portrait Gallery and smaller copy at Holyrood House.

Later years 
 By the mid-1840s Hayter's portrait style was considered old-fashioned. He adjusted his type of history painting to suit the more literal taste of the early Victorian era (e.g. Wellington Viewing Napoleon's Effigy at Madame Tussaud's; destr. 1925; engraving, 1854). Hayter also painted several large religious paintings including two depicting important Reformist events, 'Bishop Latimer Preaching at Paul's Cross' and 'The Martyrdom of Bishops Ridley and Latimer' (exh. 1855), both of which were given to the Art Museum, Princeton University, USA in 1984. He painted several biblical scenes from the Old and New Testament, among them The Angels Ministering to Christ in 1849 (V&A) and Joseph Interpreting the Baker's Dream in 1854 (Lancaster City Museums).  He also produced fluent landscape watercolours (many of Italian views), etchings (he published a volume in 1833), decorative designs and sculpture. The contents of Hayter's studio were auctioned at Christie's, London, on 19 April 1871.

His younger brother, John (1800–1895), was also an artist, known chiefly as a portrait draughtsman in chalks and crayons and his younger sister Anne worked as a miniaturist. Some sources say that the influential printmaker Stanley William Hayter was a direct descendant from John Hayter, although others say the ancestor was Sir George Hayter himself. However the family tree of John and George Hayter published in Crisps Visitations shows no possible link to SW Hayter. What is known for certain is that the French painter and writer, Jean René Bazaine was a great great grandson of George Hayter, through his eldest daughter Georgiana Elizabeth, who married Pierre-Dominique Bazaine older brother of Marshal Bazaine.

See also 
 List of British painters
 Henry Collen

References

Further reading 
 R. Ormond: Early Victorian Portraits, 2 vols, London N.P.G. cat. (London, 1973)
 Drawings by Sir George and John Hayter (exh. cat. by B. Coffey [Bryant], London, Morton Morris, 1982) [incl. checklist of prints]
 R. Walker: Regency Portraits, 2 vols, London N.P.G. cat. (London, 1986)
 O. Millar: The Victorian Pictures in the Collection of Her Majesty the Queen, 2 vols (Cambridge, 1992)
 B. Bryant: Sir George Hayter's Drawings at Duncombe Park: Family Ties and a "Melancholy Event", Apollo, cxxxv (1992), pp. 240–50 [incl. newly pubd letter of 1827]

Gallery

External links 
 

1792 births
1871 deaths
Principal Painters in Ordinary
19th-century English painters
English male painters
English portrait painters
History painters
Court painters
Knights Bachelor
Burials at East Finchley Cemetery
19th-century English male artists